Naif Al-Balawi (born 12 April 1986) is a Saudi Arabian football player who currently plays as an attacking midfielder .

External links
 

Living people
1986 births
Association football midfielders
Saudi Arabian footballers
Ittihad FC players
Ohod Club players
Al-Watani Club players
Al-Ansar FC (Medina) players
Al-Nahda Club (Saudi Arabia) players
Al-Orobah FC players
Al-Hazem F.C. players
Al-Qadsiah FC players
Najran SC players
Al-Shoulla FC players
Al-Suqoor FC players
Place of birth missing (living people)
Saudi First Division League players
Saudi Professional League players
Saudi Fourth Division players